Anobiinae is a subfamily of death-watch beetles in the family Ptinidae, with at least 45 genera. It was formerly considered a member of the family Anobiidae, but its family name has since been changed to Ptinidae.

The larvae of a number of species tend to bore into wood, earning them the name "woodworm" or "wood borer". A few species, such as the common furniture beetle, Anobium punctatum, are pests, causing damage to wooden furniture and house structures.

Genera
These 46 genera belong to the subfamily Anobiinae:

 Actenobius Fall, 1905 i c g b
 Allobregmus Español, 1970
 Anobichnium Linck, 1949
 Anobiopsis Fall, 1905 i c g
 Anobium Fabricius, 1775 i c g b
 Anomodesmina Español, 1991
 Australanobium Español, 1976 g
 Belemia Español, 1984
 Cacotemnus LeConte, 1861 g
 Colposternus Fall, 1905 i c g
 Ctenobium LeConte, 1865 i c g b
 Desmatogaster Knutson, 1963 i c g
 Endroedyina Español et Comas, 1991
 Euceratocerus LeConte, 1874 i c g b
 Falsogastrallus Pic, 1914 i c g
 Gastrallus Jacquelin du Val, 1860 i c g b
 Hadrobregmus Thomson, 1859 i c g b
 Hemicoelus LeConte, 1861 i c g b
 Hemigastrallus Español et Comas, 1991
 Leptanobium Español et Comas, 1988
 Macranobium Broun, 1886
 Magnanobium Pic, 1926
 Megabregmus Español, 1970
 Microbregma Seidlitz, 1889 i c g b
 Mimogastrallus Sakai, 2003 g
 Mimotrypopitys Pic, 1931
 Neoligomerus Español, 1981
 Nicobium LeConte, 1861 i c g b
 Oligomerus Redtenbacher, 1847 i c g b
 Paroligomerus Logvinovskiy, 1979 g
 Platybregmus Fisher, 1934 i c g b
 Priartobium Reitter, 1901 g
 Priobium Motschulsky, 1845 i c g b
 Pseudoligomerus Pic, 1933
 Pseudoserranobium Toskina, 2000
 Ptilinobium White, 1976 i c g
 Serranobium White, 1975
 Stegobium Motschulsky, 1860 i c g b
 Tasmanobium Lea, 1924
 Trichobiopsis White, 1973 g
 Trichodesma Leconte, 1861 i c g b
 Trichodesmina Español, 1982
 Xenocera Broun, 1881
 Xeranobium Fall, 1905 i c g b
 † Gastrallanobium Wickham, 1914 g

Data sources: i = ITIS, c = Catalogue of Life, g = GBIF, b = Bugguide.net

References

Further reading

External links

 

 
Bostrichoidea